The Führerhauptquartier Bärenhöhle (engl.: Führer headquarters bears cave) was a bunker facility built by the German organization Todt, which was built during the Second World War near Smolensk in the Soviet Union.

It consists of a 43 square meter cubic superstructure still visible today. The subterranean dimensions have not yet been explored. The bunker facility is located in a forest about one kilometer from the town of Gnyozdovo on the road from Smolensk to Katyn. In addition to the bunker facility, the railway embankment of the former special track is still visible.

The facility was never used by Hitler as headquarters.

References

Links
 Hitler's bunker in Smolensk

Führer Headquarters
World War II sites in Russia
World War II sites of Nazi Germany
Forts in Russia